The Mental Health Act 2007 (c 12) is an Act of the Parliament of the United Kingdom. It amended the Mental Health Act 1983 and the Mental Capacity Act 2005. It applies to people residing in England and Wales. Most of the Act was implemented on 3 November 2008.

It introduced significant changes which included:

 Introduction of Supervised Community Treatment, including Community Treatment Orders (CTOs). This new power replaces supervised discharge with a power to return the patient to hospital, where the person may be forcibly medicated, if the medication regime is not being complied with in the community. 
 Redefining professional roles: broadening the range of mental health professionals who can be responsible for the treatment of patients without their consent.
 Creating the role of approved clinician, which is a registered healthcare professional (social worker, nurse, psychologist or occupational therapist) approved by the appropriate authority to act for purposes of the Mental Health Act 1983 (as amended).
 Replacing the role of approved social worker by the role of approved mental health professional; the person fulfilling this role need not be a social worker.
 Nearest relative: making it possible for some patients to appoint a civil partner as nearest relative.
 Definition of mental disorder: introduce a new definition of mental disorder throughout the Act, abolishing previous categories
 Criteria for Involuntary commitment: introduce a requirement that someone cannot be detained for treatment unless appropriate treatment is available and remove the treatability test.
 Mental Health Tribunal (MHT): improve patient safeguards by taking an order-making power which will allow the current time limit to be varied and for automatic referral by hospital managers to the MHT.
 Introduction of independent mental health advocates (IMHAs) for 'qualifying patients'.
 Electroconvulsive Therapy may not be given to a patient who has capacity to refuse consent to it, and may only be given to an incapacitated patient where it does not conflict with any advance directive, decision of a donee or deputy or decision of the Court of Protection.

Controversy

During the Act's development, there were concerns expressed that the changes proposed by the Mental Health Bill were draconian. As a result, the government was forced in 2006 to abandon their original plans to introduce the Bill outright and had to amend the 1983 Act instead. Despite this concession, the Bill was still defeated a number of times in the House of Lords, prior to its receiving Royal Assent.

, the Green Party supported a reform of the Mental Health Act in order to remove transgender people from the Psychiatric Disorder Register, which they view as discriminatory.

See also
 Principles for the Protection of Persons with Mental Illness adopted by the United Nations General Assembly

References

External links
Mental Health Act 2007: Overview Article on the Act from WikiMentalHealth
CSIP Implementating the amended Mental Health Act from NIMHE
Mental Health Act 1983 from WikiMentalHealth Shows how the 2007 Act has updated the 1983 Act.
Select Committee on the Mental Capacity Act 2005 -  Report, post-legislative scrutiny (www.parliament.uk)
The Mental Health Act 1983, amended in 2007 Overview for mental health service users and their families.
Institute of Mental Health Act Practitioners
https://www.rcpsych.ac.uk/pdf/Applying%20for%20Approved%20Clinician%20Approval.pdf 

Acts of the Parliament of the United Kingdom concerning England and Wales
Mental health law in the United Kingdom
United Kingdom Acts of Parliament 2007